Calathus vicenteorum is a species of ground beetle from the Platyninae subfamily that is endemic to the Azores.

References

vicenteorum
Beetles described in 1937
Endemic arthropods of the Azores
Beetles of Europe